Qarah Bolagh (also Romanized as Qarah Bolāgh) is a village in Ani Rural District, in the Central District of Germi County, Ardabil Province, Iran. At the 2006 census, its population was 107, in 22 families.

References 

Tageo

Towns and villages in Germi County